Tany Yao (born 1971) is a Canadian politician who was elected in the 2015 and 2019 Alberta general elections to represent the electoral district of Fort McMurray-Wood Buffalo in the 29th and 30th Alberta Legislatures.

Background 
Yao was born in Grand Falls, New Brunswick and moved to Fort McMurray, Alberta in 1977 at the age of six. His father, Joseph Yao, was originally from Cebu in the Philippines and eventually worked as a doctor in Fort McMurray. His mother, Keiko, was a nurse within the community.

Yao graduated from Fort McMurray Composite High School in 1989 and enrolled in the EMT program at Portage College in Lac La Biche, Alberta. Ultimately he went on to become a paramedic at NAIT in Edmonton, Alberta. His first full-time job after graduating from NAIT was with the Alberta Central Air Ambulance in Lac La Biche. In 1997, Yao returned to Fort McMurray as a paramedic firefighter. He helped fight the House River Fire in 2002. In 2007, Yao was promoted to Assistant Deputy Chief of Operations - EMS for the region of Wood Buffalo.

Provincial Politics 
In late 2014 Yao considered running for office after Wildrose party was in disarray after leader Danielle Smith and eight other MLAs crossed the floor to the ruling Progressive Conservative Association of Alberta. After Brian Jean was elected as the official leader of the Wildrose Party, Yao decided to run in the riding of Fort McMurray-Wood Buffalo. The 2015 Alberta election was held on May 5, 2015. Yao defeated Progressive Conservative incumbent MLA Mike Allen.

The Wildrose retained its standing as Official Opposition in the legislature, while for the first time in Alberta history, the New Democratic Party formed government with Rachel Notley becoming premier. This marked the end of 43 years of government by the Progressive Conservatives.

On May 18, 2017, the Wildrose and the Progressive Conservatives announced that their two parties had come to a merger agreement and on July 22, 2017 the merger was passed with 95% support from both the PCs and the Wildrose. The merger agreement formed the United Conservative Party, a leadership election occurred on October 28, 2017, in which Jason Kenney was chosen as the leader of the UCP.

Yao was the UCP's official critic on Health and Emergency Response Preparedness. Yao was reelected in the 2019 Alberta general election. He endorsed Brian Jean during the 2017 UCP leadership election and again in the 2022 UCP leadership election.

Premier Danielle Smith appointed Yao to serve as parliamentary secretary for rural health under Health Minister Jason Copping on October 21, 2022. Yao was challenged by Fort McMurray Construction Association president Keith Plowman and former UCP riding association board member Zulkifl Mujahid in a nomination contest. Mujahid defeated Yao on December 4, 2022, meaning Yao could no longer represent the UCP in the riding for the 2023 Alberta general election.

Travel controversy 
Yao travelled to Mexico at the end of 2020 despite regulations that required Albertans to avoid non-essential travel due to the coronavirus pandemic. A spokesperson for the United Conservative Party said on Jan. 4, 2021 that Yao was unreachable and the party did not know where he was in Mexico.

Yao was reached by Fort McMurray Today on January 5, 2021, and said he turned his phone off upon arrival in Mexico. He said he wanted to "disconnect and clear my head" because he felt he had faced "abuse and slander in social and mainstream media" over a private member's bill he wrote. Yao was referring to a bill ending the ban on health authorities making private purchases of human blood plasma, which had been opposed by the NDP and health care groups. He also said he believed it would be safe to travel because of the release of COVID-19 vaccines, but he said he had not yet been vaccinated when he left for Mexico.

Kenney removed Yao from the Standing Committee on Families and Communities and the Standing Committee on Privileges and Elections, Standing Orders and Printing. The premier's chief of staff, Jamie Huckaby, was also asked to resign after visiting the United Kingdom. Jeremy Nixon resigned as parliamentary secretary for civil society and Tracy Allard resigned as Municipal Affairs Minister after both visited Hawaii. Jason Stephan resigned from the Treasury Board after visiting Arizona. Tanya Fir and Pat Rehn lost their legislature committee responsibilities.

Electoral history

2019 general election

2015 general election

|}

References

Wildrose Party MLAs
Living people
1971 births
21st-century Canadian politicians
Canadian firefighters
Paramedics
People from Grand Falls, New Brunswick
People from Fort McMurray
Canadian politicians of Chinese descent
Canadian politicians of Filipino descent
United Conservative Party MLAs